Lee Perry (born 16 December 1959 in Australia) is an Australian voice actor known for portraying various characters in either direct-to-video or theatrical relisted movies like Three Dollars, $9.99 and both Happy Feet and Happy Feet Two.

Career
Perry's television voice overs include characters and narrations in Men in Black: The Series, Always Greener, Farscape: The Peacekeeper Wars and Sisters of War.

Perry has voiced over many commercials, IVRs, radio/TV promos, ad campaigns and tour programs.

Perry provided the narration for Baz Luhrmann's version of the song "Everybody's Free (To Wear Sunscreen)".

Personal life
Perry currently lives in Sydney, Australia. His brother, Alex, is a fashion designer.

Filmography

Film

Television

Video games

References

External links
 

1959 births
Australian male voice actors
Living people